Ute Hankers (born 21 February 1965) is a German former volleyball player. She competed in the women's tournament at the 1984 Summer Olympics.

References

External links
 

1965 births
Living people
German women's volleyball players
Olympic volleyball players of West Germany
Volleyball players at the 1984 Summer Olympics
People from Osnabrück (district)
Sportspeople from Lower Saxony